"The Old Refrain" was a Viennese popular song ostensibly written by Fritz Kreisler but was actually a transcription of an earlier work by Johann Brandl ("Du alter Stefansturm" from Der liebe Augustin) with words by Alice Mattullath.

Covers
Over the years this very popular song has been covered over 90 times.

References

Austrian songs
Year of song missing
Jeanette MacDonald songs